The Best of 3 Dog Night is the fifteenth album by the American rock band, Three Dog Night and is a double album released in 1982. It was certified Gold by the RIAA on May 1, 1996.

Seven of these titles landed on the Billboard Adult contemporary chart when originally released and all 20 hit the Hot 100.

Critical reception

Stephen Thomas Erlewine of AllMusic writes, "There isn't anything major missing, and while some of the non-singles material isn't particularly strong, there are enough worthwhile moments to make this a fairly consistent, enjoyable listen, in addition to being the one Three Dog Night album most fans will need."

Track listing

	

	

The CD release follows the same track list.

Personnel
Mike Allsup - guitar
Jimmy Greenspoon - keyboard
Danny Hutton - vocals
Skip Konte - keyboard
Chuck Negron - vocals
Jack Ryland - bass guitar
Joe Schermie - bass guitar
Floyd Sneed - percussion, drums
Cory Wells - vocals

Production
Producers: Richard Podolor, Gabriel Mekler, Jimmy Ienner
Compilation: Vince Cosgrave
Art direction: Vartan
Design: Jay Vigon
Artwork: Jay Vigon

Certifications

References

Best of 3 Dog Night, The
Best of 3 Dog Night, The
Albums produced by Jimmy Ienner
Albums produced by Richard Podolor
Albums produced by Gabriel Mekler
MCA Records compilation albums